Atticus: ...Dragging the Lake, Vol. 2 was the second in the series of compilation albums created by Atticus Clothing.

Track listing
 "I'm Not Invisible" by Rocket from the Crypt
 "Remedy" by Hot Water Music
 "To Awake and Avenge the Dead" by Thrice
 "Worms of the Earth" by Finch
 "Fields of Athenry" by Dropkick Murphys
 "Don't Tell Me It's Over" by Blink-182
 "Vacant Skies" by Sparta
 "Once Again" by Slick Shoes
 "Noble Stabbings!" by Dillinger Four
 "All My People" by Suicide Machines
 "E. Dagger" by Lagwagon
 "Soleil" by Maxeen
 "Pride War" by Further Seems Forever
 "William Tell Override" by Jets to Brazil
 "All Systems Go" by Box Car Racer
 "One Seventeen" by Transplants
 "All We Want" by H2O
 "You're So Last Summer" by Taking Back Sunday
 "Heaven Knows" by Rise Against
 "A Jackknife to a Swan" by The Mighty Mighty Bosstones
 "The Greatest Fall (Of All Time)" by Matchbook Romance
 "Misled" by Hot Rod Circuit
 "Next to Go" by Down by Law
 "Be There" by Over My Dead Body
 "Some Came Running" by Bane
 "Crawl" (Live) by Alkaline Trio

References

2003 compilation albums